Anteeksi kuinka? is a Finnish television series. It first aired on Finnish TV in 1993 and last aired in 1996.

See also
List of Finnish television series

External links
 

Finnish television shows
1993 Finnish television series debuts
1996 Finnish television series endings
1990s Finnish television series
MTV3 original programming